Mitral annular disjunction (MAD) is a structural abnormality of the heart in the mitral annulus ring. It is generally defined as an abnormal displacement of the location of where the posterior mitral valve leaflet inserts onto the left atrial wall and the left ventricular wall. This abnormal attachment allows for mitral valve to become hypermobile and can result in ventricular arrhythmias.

History 
MAD was first described in 1986 through autopsy analysis of hearts while investigating incidence of mitral valve prolapse.

Pathophysiology 
The cause of MAD is not well understood. Hypotheses of congenital, degenerative, and acquired structural abnormalities exist. However, the physical characteristics of MAD are able to be observed through a variety of cardiac imaging techniques. Normally the posterior aspect of the mitral annulus is attached to the posterior aspect of the left ventricular wall. In MAD, there is a distinct separation between the mitral annular ring and left ventricular wall. During systole, contraction of the ventricle, the mitral valve leaflet moves away from the ventricular wall and does not move as synchronously as in a heart without MAD. The degree of disjunction can range from a few millimeters to great than 10 millimeters.

Diagnosis 
MAD can be diagnosed with transthoracic echocardiography. Additionally, it can also be diagnosed by cardiac computed tomography and cardiac MRI.

Risk factors 
Mitral annular disjunction is considered a risk factor for mitral valve prolapse and myxomatous degeneration of the mitral valve. This is thought to be due to the hypermobility of the mitral leaflet during the cardiac cycle. There has been an observed association between MAD and cardiac arrhythmias, theorized to be caused by fibrosis of the cardiac muscle secondary to the hypermobility and myxomatous degeneration. In rare cases, this fibrosis can lead to cardiac arrest.

References 

Valvular heart disease